Matheus Pereira da Silva (born 25 February 1998) is a Brazilian professional footballer who plays as an attacking midfielder for Spanish club Eibar.

Career

Early life
Matheus began playing for Corinthians's academy at the age of eleven. He has been considered one of the club's most promising young players in years.

Corinthians
Matheus was elevated to the professional team in January 2015 for the team's pre-season in Florida, United States. He did not take part in any of the friendly matches, only participating in training sessions. He was a non-used substitute during several matches, most of them of the Campeonato Brasileiro Série A. He made his debut in a friendly match against ABC on 22 July 2015, playing the entire game, which was a celebration of ABC's centennial.

Matheus made his official debut on 23 August 2015 in the second half of Corinthians' 3–0 victory against Cruzeiro at Arena Corinthians. His first official start was against Santos in a Copa do Brasil match on 26 August.

Empoli and Juventus
On 28 June 2016, Matheus was signed by Serie A club Empoli F.C. In April 2016, it was reported that Matheus had completed a deal to sign with Juventus in the summer of 2016. However, as the Turin-based club had already exceeded their non-EU registration quota for international transfers, he would be signed by Empoli from Corinthians first, before joining Juventus.

On 31 January 2017, Matheus was signed by the Serie A club Juventus on loan.

On 31 August 2017, the last of day of the French and Italian summer transfer windows, he joined Bordeaux on loan from Juventus for the 2017–18 season, while Bordeaux secured an option to sign him permanently.

On 27 April 2019, Matheus played his first match both in Serie A and with the Juventus senior side, coming on as a substitute for Federico Bernardeschi late in the second half of a 1–1 away draw against rivals Inter; he almost scored the match-winning goal in the final minute.

Loan to Dijon
On 29 August 2019, he joined the French club Dijon on loan with an option to purchase.

Barcelona B
On 25 January 2020, Pereira was sent on loan to the Spanish club Barcelona B, in a deal involving Alejandro Marqués moving the other way. The club later activated his buyout clause.

Eibar
On 12 July 2022, Barcelona announced the transfer of Pereira to Segunda División side SD Eibar.

Career statistics

Honours
Juventus
 Serie A: 2018–19

Corinthians
Campeonato Brasileiro Série A: 2015

Brazil U17
South American Under-17 Football Championship: 2015

References

External links
FC Barcelona official profile
 

1998 births
Living people
Footballers from São Paulo
Brazilian footballers
Association football midfielders
Sport Club Corinthians Paulista players
Empoli F.C. players
Juventus F.C. players
Juventus Next Gen players
FC Girondins de Bordeaux players
Paraná Clube players
Dijon FCO players
FC Barcelona Atlètic players
Campeonato Brasileiro Série A players
Serie A players
Serie C players
Ligue 1 players
Championnat National 3 players
Segunda División B players
Primera Federación players
Segunda División players
Brazil youth international footballers
Brazilian expatriate footballers
Brazilian expatriate sportspeople in Italy
Brazilian expatriate sportspeople in France
Brazilian expatriate sportspeople in Spain
Expatriate footballers in Italy
Expatriate footballers in France
Expatriate footballers in Spain